Al-Qala Club is a Saudi Arabian football (soccer) team in Al-Jawf  playing at the Saudi Second Division.

Current squad

References

Football clubs in Saudi Arabia
1974 establishments in Saudi Arabia
Association football clubs established in 1974
Football clubs in Sakakah